Coral Reef Drive, also known as Southwest 152nd Street, is a  main east–west road south of Miami in Miami-Dade County, Florida, United States. It serves to connect the communities of Country Walk and Richmond Heights with Palmetto Bay. State Road 992 (SR 992) is designated along the  section of Coral Reef Drive between the Homestead Extension of Florida's Turnpike and US 1.

Route description

Western section
Coral Reef Drive begins along the southern edge of a housing estate at Southwest 162nd Avenue in Country Walk, though an unmarked dirt road continues west to SR 997 through agricultural fields. After crossing Southwest 157th Avenue, Coral Reef Drive forms the boundary between Country Walk and Richmond West. Here, it also becomes a palm-lined road, travelling along the back of houses on either side, increasing in width to four lanes after crossing Naranja Road (Southwest 147th Avenue). After crossing a canal, Coral Reef Drive continues to pass in between neighborhoods until it reaches a couple of small shopping malls and Lindgren Road (Southwest 137th Avenue), a northern portion of which is designated as SR 825. East of here, Coral Reef Drive passes along the southern boundary of Three Lakes; while to its south lies the former Naval Air Station Richmond site, now taken up by the South Campus of the University of Miami, the Gold Coast Railroad Museum and Zoo Miami. After passing a shopping mall at Three Lakes' eastern end, Coral Reef Drive meets the Homestead Extension of Florida's Turnpike, gaining the SR 992 designation.

State Road 992 section
State Road 992 begins at the interchange of Coral Reef Drive with the Homestead Extension of Florida's Turnpike, and proceeds east as a four-laned divided road, immediately forming the boundary between Richmond Heights and Palmetto Estates, and continues on through residential neighborhoods. In sections along Coral Reef Drive's northern side lie frontage roads, allowing access to side streets and some residential properties; however, most houses continue to back on to the road like in areas to the west of the Turnpike. In eastern Richmond Heights, SR 992 passes the Coral Reef Senior High School, and then forms the northern boundary of the Palmetto Golf Course as it leaves Richmond Heights on its left and meets the southernmost tip of Kendall. After passing the Jackson South Community Hospital (formerly known as Deering Hospital), SR 992 crosses the South Miami-Dade Busway and terminates at US 1, with Coral Reef Drive extending eastwards beyond the highway into Palmetto Bay.

Eastern section
As Coral Reef Drive crosses US 1, it enters the village of Palmetto Bay, and continues eastwards as a two-laned suburban street through residential areas. After a couple of miles, Coral Reef Drive intersects with Old Cutler Road, and then continues a short distance to terminate at the southern end of Ludlam Road, with its pavement extending east as Paradise Point Drive into a gated community on the shores of Biscayne Bay. The oolitic limestone & coral rock wall from 89th Ave. to 86th Ave. on the southern side, was built in 1919. It is a historic landmark designated by Miami-Dade County's Office of Historic Preservation.

History

SR 992 was signed in 1983.

Major intersections

See also

References

Roads in Miami-Dade County, Florida